NGC 6872, also known as the Condor Galaxy, is a large barred spiral galaxy of type  in the constellation Pavo. It was discovered on 27 June 1835 by English astronomer John Herschel.

Star formation rates 
When observed in the ultraviolet and mid-infrared, the central region and bar of  show old stars and low rates of star formation, with rates increasing along the spiral arms as distance from the core increases. The most active region of star formation, located in the northeast arm, shows a stellar flux around 1,000 times higher than in the central region, though this may be affected by the density of stellar dust in the core. The extended portions of both arms exhibit young star cluster formations with ages ranging from one to one hundred million years. Star formation rates in the northeast extended arm are twice that of the southwest extended arm, and five times the formation rate in the sections of the arms closer to the central region.

Interaction with IC 4970 
IC 4970 is a nearby lenticular galaxy, located only a few arcseconds away, and is known to be interacting with NGC 6872. Horrelou and Koribalski (2007), using a computer simulation to determine how the two galaxies were interacting, reported that  approached  nearly along the plane of its spiral disk, making its closest approach approximately 130 million years ago and resulting in the latter's current highly elongated shape.

An ultraviolet-to-infrared study by Eufrasio, et al. The same appears to have also occurred in the southwestern arm. The bright ultraviolet nature of this cluster indicates that it contains stars less than 200 million years old, which roughly coincides with the timeframe of the collision. Mihos, et al. (1993), and Eufrasio, et al.

Possible interaction with NGC 6876 
Machacek, et al. Any or all of these processes may be responsible for the trail.

See also 
 Antennae Galaxies
 NGC 2207 and IC 2163
 NGC 5090 and NGC 5091

Notes

References

External links 

 
 NGC 6872 at SIMBAD

Barred spiral galaxies
Peculiar galaxies
Interacting galaxies
Pavo (constellation)
073-32
64413
6872
20115-7055
18350627